Ma Lin may refer to:

Ma Lin (painter) (13th century), Song dynasty Chinese painter
Ma Lin (warlord) (1873–1945), Chinese warlord, Chairman of Qinghai (1931–1938)
Ma Lin (biochemist) (1924–2017), Vice-Chancellor of the Chinese University of Hong Kong
Ma Lin (footballer) (born 1962), Chinese football player and team manager
Ma Lin (table tennis) (born 1980), Chinese table tennis player
Ma Lin (Paralympic table tennis) (born 1989), Chinese/Australian Paralympic table tennis player
Ma Lin (Water Margin), fictional character in the Water Margin